Ralph Verney, 1st Earl Verney (18 March 1683 – 4 October 1752), of Middle Claydon, near Buckingham, Buckinghamshire, known as The Viscount Fermanagh until 1742, was initially a  Tory and later a Whig politician who sat in the House of Commons in two phases between 1717 and 1752.

Early life
Verney was born at Little Chelsea,  the only surviving son of John Verney, 1st Viscount Fermanagh and his first wife Elizabeth Palmer, the eldest daughter of Ralph Palmer, and was baptised in Kensington. He was educated at  Mrs  Morland's school at Hackney from around 1695 to 1700 and matriculated at Merton College, Oxford in 1700. He married Catherine Paschall, eldest daughter of Henry Paschall of Baddow, Essex at St Giles in the Fields on 24 February 1708.

Career
Verney succeeded his father as viscount and took his seat in the Irish House of Lords on 23 June 1717. The latter title was in the Peerage of Ireland and thus didn't prevent him from entering the British House of Commons. He was returned unopposed as Tory Member of Parliament for Amersham at a by-election on 10 July 1717. In 1719, he voted against the repeal of the Occasional Conformity and Schism Acts and the Peerage Bill. At the 1722 British general election, he was returned again unopposed as MP for Amersham. He did not stand at the  1727 British general election, by which time he was described as ‘being unconcerned for any party’.

Verney did not sit in parliament for several years, but began to develop an electoral interest at Wendover. At the 1741 British general election he was elected MP for Wendover as a Whig. He was returned unopposed for Wendover at the 1747 British general election.

Family
Verney's wife died in 1748 and Verney survived her by four years, dying at Little Chelsea on 4 October 1752. They were both buried in Middle Claydon. The couple had two sons and two daughters. The older son John  predeceased him in 1737 and he was succeeded in his titles by his second son Ralph. John's daughter Mary was raised to the Peerage in her own right in 1792.

Notes

References

1683 births
1752 deaths
Ralph
British MPs 1715–1722
British MPs 1722–1727
British MPs 1741–1747
British MPs 1747–1754
Earls in the Peerage of Ireland
Members of the Parliament of Great Britain for English constituencies